Seni Gayung Fatani is a martial art, specifically a style of silat from Malaysia based on the art of war, the combination punch and kick striking, joint-locking and grappling techniques, and various type of melee weapon. In Malay, the word seni means art and gayung is a word for martial arts, synonymous with silat. Fatani means wise in Arabic and was chosen in 1976 by the councils of Guru Tua (Senior Masters). The first grandmaster of the silat is Tuan Guru Hj Anuar Abd. Wahab (1976–2009). Tuan Guru Aminuddin Haji Anuar is the current grandmaster of Seni Gayung Fatani Malaysia (from 2013).

Origin 

Seni Gayung Fatani originated from the Malaysian Empire. In 1840, it was brought to Kedah by Syeikh Abdul Rahman. The style was expanded upon by his son Tok Yah Ramli. Another of Abdul Rahman's students was Pak Teh Mat Ali who taught this style to Pak Andak Embong, who in turn passed it down to Tuan Guru Anuar Abdul Wahab. When it was registered in 1976 as an association under the government's Club Act, it was formally renamed the Seni Gayung Fatani Association.

See also 
Silat Melayu

Notes

References 
Anuar Abd. Wahab (1992). Teknik dalam Seni Silat Melayu (Technique in Malay Silat). Dewan Bahasa dan Pustaka, Kuala Lumpur.
Leong Siok Hui (2005). "Lessons in Grace & Confidence", "Changed Children" & "Preserving Tradition". TheStar Newspaper, 13 August 2005.
Anuar Abd. Wahab (2006). "Istilah Silat", Martabat Silat Warisan Negara, Keaslian Budaya Membina Bangsa PESAKA.
Anuar Abd. Wahab (2007). Silat: The development history of traditional Malay silat and development of modern Silat Malaysia curriculum. Hizi Print, Bdr. Baru Bangi.

External links 
Official website of Pertubuhan Seni Gayung Fatani Malaysia (Pertubuhan Seni Gayung Fatani Malaysia)
  (Silat Coaching Program)
  (English)
Culture Silat - Seni Gayung Fatani Malaysia (french)
Seni Gayung Fatani - Bangi website (Malay)

Seni Gayung Fatani 
 

Silat